Finders of the Lost Yacht is a Finnish film written and directed by Taavi Vartia. The film draws inspiration from the Finnish children's book series Pertsa ja Kilu by Väinö Riikkilä and specifically from the novel Viimeiset kaanit (eng. The Last Khans). The film follows the adventures of two best friends, Pertsa and Kilu, as they embark on a search for a lost treasure while trying to evade a robber.

The film stars Olavi Kiiski and Oskari Mustikkaniemi as Pertsa and Kilu respectively. The film also stars: Sara Vänskä, Mimosa Willamo, Elias Westerberg, Anu Sinisalo, Turkka Mastomäki, Ville Myllyrinne, Elsa Saisio and Hannes Suominen, among others.

The film premiered in July 2021 after being pushed back due to the COVID-19 pandemic and was the 10th most watched film in Finland for that year.

A sequel, Finders 2: Pharaoh's Ring, is currently in production.

Critical reception

References 

2021 films
Finnish children's films
Films based on books
Films scored by Panu Aaltio